Elias Levy (also known as Aleph One) is a computer scientist. He was the moderator of  "Bugtraq", a full disclosure vulnerability mailing list, from May 14, 1996 until October 15, 2001.

He was the CTO and co-founder of the computer security company SecurityFocus, which was acquired by Symantec on August 6, 2002. He is also known as the author of the article "Smashing The Stack For Fun and Profit", published in 1996 Phrack magazine issue 49, which was the first high-quality, public, step-by-step introduction to stack buffer overflow vulnerabilities and their exploitation.

After the sale of SecurityFocus to Symantec in August 2002, Levy was accused by many of "selling out" and compromising the high principles of the Bugtraq list. The Full-Disclosure mailing list was founded in part as a protest against the sale.

External links
 "Smashing The Stack For Fun and Profit" from 'Phrack' magazine
 Hackers, episode of NetCafe including an interview with Aleph One
 Full-Disclosure mailing list
 Network Computing feature about Levy and Bugtraq

Levy E
Living people
Year of birth missing (living people)